Battlestar Galactica: Razor Flashbacks is a collective title given to a series of seven "webisodes" released in late 2007 in lead up to the television movie Battlestar Galactica: Razor via the World Wide Web and weekly airing.  According to Ronald D. Moore, the Razor Flashbacks, in contrast to both The Resistance and The Face of the Enemy webseries, should technically be considered as featurettes. 'The distinction between the two is that webisodes were new material created specifically for the internet, while the featurettes are really little more than deleted scenes from Razor. Despite this, the series is still often referred to as being a series of webisodes due to their separate release.

The final scene, "Escape", featuring Edward James Olmos as the older Adama, is omitted in both the television and extended DVD versions of Razor. Otherwise, the flashbacks from "The Lab" onwards were directly integrated into the TV version, while the DVD edition included all of the remaining episodes except "Day 4,571" and "The Hangar".  All webisodes are available for individual viewing on the Region 1, 2 and 4 DVD sets of Razor as a special feature, and are included in "The Complete Series" DVD and Blu-ray box sets. The webisodes are also available as free downloads on the Xbox Live Marketplace, some of which are featured in high-definition 720p resolution.

Plot
The series is set during the final stages of the First Cylon War. It focuses on a younger William "Husker" Adama in his fighter pilot days aboard Galactica while on an important mission to uncover the Cylons' “super weapon” on a mysterious icy planet.

The webisode series starts on the 4,571st day of the war (about 40 years before the destruction of the Twelve Colonies of Kobol). While Galactica is fighting Cylon threats, Adama faces his own problems when he discovers his lover has been gravely injured after her raptor is attacked by the Cylons. Adama soon finds himself swung into action shooting down Cylon raiders, but after a head-on collision with a raider, ejects and lands on the nearby planet, only to be confronted by the unexpected reality of what the Cylons have been working on.

Webisodes

Cast
 Young Lt. William "Husker" Adama, played by Nico Cortez
 Aaron Doral, played by Matthew Bennett
 Ops Officer, played by Chris Bradford
 Hybrid, played by Campbell Lane
 Banzai (squad leader), played by Jacob Blair
 Lt. Jaycie McGavin, played by Allison Warnyca
 Frightened man, played by Ben Cotton
 Commander William Adama, 40 years after the war and just prior to the destruction of the colonies, played by Edward James Olmos ("Escape" only)

References

External links
Razor Flashbacks at the Battlestar Wiki
Razor Flashbacks at IMDB

2007 web series debuts
2007 web series endings
Razor Flashbacks
Razor Flashbacks
American science fiction web series